A standing ovation is a form of applause where members of a seated audience stand up while applauding after extraordinary performances of particularly high acclaim. In Ancient Rome returning military commanders (such as Marcus Licinius Crassus after his defeat of Spartacus) whose victories did not quite meet the requirements of a triumph but which were still praiseworthy were celebrated with an ovation instead, from the Latin ovo, "I rejoice". The word's use in English to refer to sustained applause dates from at least 1831.

Standing ovations are considered to be a special honor. Often are used at the entrance or departure of a speaker or performer, where the audience members will continue the ovation until the ovated person leaves or begins their speech. 

Some audience members worldwide have observed that the standing ovation has come to be devalued, such as in the field of politics, in which on some occasions standing ovations may be given to political leaders as a matter of course, rather than as a special honour in unusual circumstances. Examples include party conferences in many countries, where the speech of the party leader is rewarded with a "stage managed" standing ovation as a matter of course, and the State of the Union Address of the President of the United States (see ovations at 6:15 and 7:00 ). It is routine, rather than exceptional, for this address to be introduced, interrupted and followed by standing ovations, from both the president's own party and his political opponents. However, by tradition all ovations that occur before the speech begins, as opposed to those that interrupt it, are given in praise of the office itself, rather than the individual office-holder, and the president is never introduced by name.

Standing ovations are also often given in a sporting context to reflect an outstanding individual performance.

References

Human communication
Show business terms